Hotaka may refer to:

Japan
 Hotaka, Nagano
 Mount Hotaka (disambiguation)
 Mount Hotaka (Gunma)
 Mount Hotaka (Nagano, Gifu)

People with the given name
 Hotaka Nakamura (born 1997), Japanese footballer (soccer)
 Hotaka Yamakawa (born 1991), Japanese professional baseball player

See also
 Hotak (disambiguation)
 Hodaka (disambiguation)

Japanese masculine given names